Vlado Trifunov (born 18 April 1970) is a retired Macedonian football midfielder.

References

1970 births
Living people
Macedonian footballers
FK Makedonija Gjorče Petrov players
Association football midfielders
North Macedonia international footballers